The New Power Generation, also known as The NPG, was the backing band of musician Prince from 1990 to 2013. They were replaced by 3rdeyegirl as his backing band in 2013. In 2015, the New Power Generation reunited as Prince's backing band for his final studio album before his death, Hit n Run Phase Two. They reunited once again in 2017 for a US and European tour.

History
The phrase "Welcome to the New Power Generation" was mentioned on the opening track of 1988's Lovesexy. New Power Generation was used for the first time as a band name in the 1990 film Graffiti Bridge, and a song entitled "New Power Generation" appeared on the accompanying soundtrack album.

The New Power Generation debuted live during the Nude Tour in 1990 and on record on the 1991 album Diamonds and Pearls. The band consisted of holdovers from the Nude Tour: Michael Bland (drums), Levi Seacer, Jr. (guitar), Rosie Gaines (keyboards and backing vocals), Tony M. (lead raps and dancing), Kirk Johnson (percussion and dancing), and Damon Dickson (dancing), along with two new members Tommy Barbarella (keyboards) and Sonny T. (bass). Rosie Gaines left the band after the Diamonds and Pearls Tour and was replaced by keyboardist Morris Hayes.

When Prince began his formal dispute with Warner Bros. and changed his stage name to an unpronounceable symbol in 1993, the NPG became a side-project for Prince, allowing him to release music outside of his contract. The NPG was intended to appeal to a more urban audience than Prince's mainstream material.

The NPG's debut album, Goldnigga, featured Tony M. as lead vocalist/rapper. The album relied heavily on rap, while the music itself was reminiscent of the 1970s funk. Prince participated heavily in writing and performing the music, while Tony wrote and performed raps. Prince provided co-lead vocals on two songs, "Black M.F. in the House" and "Johnny", and the two were often performed by him in his own concerts and after shows.

A reduced NPG returned to the Prince fold when he began performing under the symbolic moniker in early 1994, backing him on The Gold Experience. The rappers and dancers were let go, and Levi Seacer left the band as well. Given an expanded role in the band was dancer Mayte Garcia who provided backing and Spanish vocals. This incarnation released Exodus in 1995. Prince again took a role behind the scenes, adopting the guise of the masked "Tora Tora" and performing lead vocals on several tracks, sometimes with an altered voice. His participation in this version of the NPG was much more apparent. Although several raps were recorded for the album, they were left out of the final release, and the focus was more on funk.

In 1996, longstanding members Michael Bland, Tommy Barbarella, and Sonny T. were fired and a new band was formed for touring. Guitarists Kat Dyson and Mike Scott, along with bassist Rhonda Smith joined Morris Hayes and Kirk Johnson, who re-joined the band to play drums.

In 1998, another NPG album was released titled Newpower Soul (modifying a song title from Exodus). In fact, a spoken outtake from Exodus mentions the upcoming album, indicating its planning stages. Prince features prominently on the cover and liner notes and provides lead vocals on all songs. Unlike the two previous releases, the album relies heavily on drum programming by Kirk Johnson and features input from Larry Graham and Doug E. Fresh.

A fourth album, Peace, due to be released in 2001, never materialized and although a few songs have been made public through limited-release singles at concerts ("Peace" / "2045: Radical Man" and "The Daisy Chain" / "Gamillah") and through Prince's former official website, NPG Music Club. The songs were later included on the Prince albums The Slaughterhouse and The Chocolate Invasion.

The band since has been a "revolving door" of musicians, who usually stay for a couple years before being replaced. It is often nebulous as to who is actually an 'official' member.

In 2010, three former members of the original New Power Generation, drummer Michael Bland, keyboardist Tommy Barbarella and bass player Sonny T., became members of Nick Jonas and the Administration (a side project of Nick Jonas of the Jonas Brothers).

In 2013, NPG singer Elisa Fiorillo (Dease) formed a duo with Nashville-based guitarist Tyler Reese, called The Dease & Reese Project, and in 2014 released the album Life in 20 (REMU Records). Fiorillo continued to perform with Prince.

The NPG collaborated with Prince once more in 2015 on what would be his last studio album, Hit n Run Phase Two.

After Prince's untimely death in 2016, the band reunited in 2017 and 2019 for a US and European Prince tribute tour.

Discography
This is the discography of The New Power Generation, credited as a separate entity from Prince.

Albums credited to Prince and The New Power Generation

Albums credited to The New Power Generation

Albums with contributions by The New Power Generation

Singles credited to Prince and The New Power Generation

Singles credited to The New Power Generation

Singles with contributions by The New Power Generation

See also
 List of artists who reached number one in the United States
 List of artists who reached number one on the U.S. dance chart

References

 
Musical groups established in 1990
Musical groups disestablished in 2013
Rock music groups from Minnesota
American funk musical groups
Prince (musician)
Musical groups from the Twin Cities
Musical backing groups